Reborn!, known in Japan as , is a Japanese manga series written and illustrated by Akira Amano. It follows Tsunayoshi Sawada, a young boy who discovers that he is next in line to become boss of the Vongola family, a powerful Mafia organization. The Vongolas' most powerful hitman, a gun-toting infant named Reborn, is sent to teach Tsuna how to be a boss. It was serialized in Shueisha's Weekly Shōnen Jump from May 2004 to November 2012, with its chapters collected into 42 tankōbon volumes.

An anime television series adaptation by Artland was broadcast on TV Tokyo from October 2006 to September 2010, and ran for 203 episodes. A number of video games, light novels, and other products were also created based on the series. In North America, Viz Media licensed the manga and the streaming rights for the television series for English release. Viz Media only published the first sixteen volumes, with the last one being released in July 2010. Discotek Media later licensed the home video rights for the television series for subbed-only release.

Reborn! is one of the best-selling manga series of Weekly Shōnen Jump, with over 30 million tankōbon copies in circulation. Reviewers praised its humor, storylines, fights and character designs, noting that the series grew more violent after volume eight, becoming a more typical shōnen series.

Plot

In Reborn! a boy, Tsunayoshi "Tsuna" Sawada, is chosen to become the tenth boss of the Vongola Family, as he is the great-great-great grandson of the first Vongola boss—who moved to Japan from Italy. Timoteo, the Vongola IX—the current head of the family—, sends Reborn, an infant hitman from Italy, to train the reluctant Tsuna. The clumsy, underachieving Tsuna becomes stronger, more confident and willing, making him a suitable Vongola family boss despite his continued reluctance. He makes several friends, including his love interest Kyoko Sasagawa.

Tsuna gets out of many scrapes on his way to becoming the Vongola boss, fighting escaped Mafia convicts posing as Kokuyo Junior High School students. The Varia, the Vongola assassin squad, want their boss, Xanxus, to be the Vongola boss and initiate a competition with Tsuna. To defeat the Varia, Reborn recruits Tsuna's schoolmates as Vongola guardians: Hayato Gokudera, an explosives expert who wants to be Tsuna's right-hand man; Takeshi Yamamoto, an athlete who likes baseball and cluelessly thinks of the Mafia as a game; Ryohei Sasagawa, captain of the school boxing club and Kyoko's older brother, and head prefect Kyoya Hibari. Lambo, a weak infant hitman who wants to kill Reborn; and Chrome Dokuro, a girl with links to the criminal Mukuro Rokudo, also join them.

After defeating the Varia, Tsuna and his friends are transported to the future to face the Millefiore family, who are killing the Vongolas. They discover that the Arcobaleno, the seven strongest infants, are dead except for Lal Mirch. When Tsuna and the Vongola guardians fight the Millefiore, they learn that Shoichi Irie, a comrade of Tsuna's future self, sent them to the future because the future Tsuna said they were the only ones able to defeat Millefiore leader Byakuran. Byakuran, who has obtained knowledge from parallel worlds, wants to obtain all the Mafia rings to become omniscient.

Tsuna and his group defeat Byakuran and return to the present, where they learn that he is to be installed as Vongola X. The ceremony is disrupted by the Simon Family, who have sworn revenge on the Vongola founding father for allegedly betraying the first Simon boss. Tsuna confronts the Simon Family on a secluded island; the Vindice, a group of former Arcobaleno who protect the laws of the mafia, are involved in the fight and imprison the losers. After several battles it is learned that Demon Spade, the first generation Vongola Mist Guardian, was manipulating Simon, using the conflict to control Mukuro Rokudo and remake the Vongola in his image. The combined strength of Tsuna and Simon's leader, Enma Kozato, defeats him.

After Tsuna reconciles with Simon, Reborn and the other Arcobaleno compete among themselves to remove their curse. Each Arcobaleno chooses a representative to fight for them and the winner will be able to undo the curse. The Vindice enter the competition, informing Reborn and Tsuna that the tournament is a front for the selection of a new Arcobaleno; the previous Arcobaleno die or become Vindice. Tsuna joins the remaining teams to defeat Bermuda, a former Arcobaleno, and the Vindice. On the final day of the Representative Battle of the Rainbow, Tsuna defeats Bermuda and his team. Checker Face, who inflicted the Arcobaleno Curse of the Rainbow, reveals his true identity as Kawahira, administrator of the humankind's ultimate power, Tri-ni-set. Finding another way to keep the Tri-ni-set safe, Kawahira agrees to entrust it to future generations and remove the curse.

After the Arcobaleno battle, Tsuna refuses to become the tenth head of the Vongola Family and Reborn leaves. A week after his departure, Tsuna realizes that he is still his no-good self; nothing has changed. Reborn returns to train Tsuna as Neo-Vongola Primo, similar to Vongola Decimo; Tsuna remembers that he now has friends he can rely on and has been changed by his experiences, thanks to his tutor and partner Reborn.

Publication

Main series

Akira Amano published Reborn!s prototypes in seinen magazines until a one-shot was published on November 17, 2003, in Shueisha's shōnen manga magazine Weekly Shōnen Jump. The manga was serialized in the same magazine from May 24, 2004, to November 12, 2012. Its chapters were collected and published in forty-two tankōbon volumes by Shueisha, released from October 4, 2004, to March 4, 2013.

The series was licensed in North America and the United Kingdom by Viz Media, who published the manga under the Shonen Jump Advanced imprint. The first volume was published October 3, 2006, and Viz' last volume—the sixteenth—was published July 6, 2010. Reborn! is licensed in Brazil by Panini Comics, in France by Glénat, in Germany by Tokyopop, in Singapore by Chuang Yi, in Spain by Planeta DeAgostini and in Taiwan by Tong Li Publishing.

Spin-off
A spin-off manga titled  created by Toshinori Takayama was serialized in Shueisha's Saikyō Jump from December 2010 to November 2012. It was compiled into three volumes released in 2012 on June 4, September 4 and December 4 respectively.

Media

Anime

The series was adapted into a 203-episode anime television series, produced by Artland and directed by Kenichi Imaizumi, which aired from October 7, 2006 to September 25, 2010 on TV Tokyo. Because the anime series was not licensed for distribution outside Japan, Funimation exercised power of attorney on behalf of the Japanese production company to remove fansubbed episodes of the anime from the Internet. To prevent copyright infringement, cease and desist notices were sent to fansub groups who were subtitling the series. On March 21, 2009 the anime website Crunchyroll began streaming subtitled episodes of the series in North America, with new episodes available within an hour after they were aired in Japan. In 2011, Viz Media licensed an uncut, subtitled version for streaming on Hulu and VizAnime.com. In Japan the complete series was released into DVD volumes by Marvelous Entertainment between January 26, 2007 and April 29, 2011. Five DVD box sets were released between June 17, 2009 and March 21, 2012 by Marvelous Entertainment in Japan. On July 18, 2018, Discotek Media announced that they had licensed the anime series for home video release with two 2-disc SD on BD sets, the first 101 episodes on September 25, 2018, and then the other 102 episodes on October 30, 2018.

An original video animation was produced under the same staff and cast and was released in October 2009 during the annual Jump Super Anime Tour. It was released by Pony Canyon on DVD on July 21, 2010, under the title . The DVD version included a short version showed on the tour and a complete edition with new scenes.

CDs
Reborn!s music was composed by Toshihiko Sahashi, with each theme released as a single, album or character song. Four Reborn! soundtracks have been released by Pony Canyon in Japan; the first was released on December 20, 2006 and the second was released on April 18, 2007. The third and the fourth were released on August 20, 2008 and on September 15, 2010 respectively. Most of the series' Japanese voice actors have recorded songs for the Katekyo Hitman Reborn! Character Soshutsuen Album Vongola Family Sotojo - Shinukidekatare! Soshiteutae!, and Pony Canyon released a three-volume Opening and Ending Theme Songs.

Video games
Twenty-one video games are based on the series, and its characters appear in Jump Super Stars, Jump Ultimate Stars, and J-Stars Victory VS. The first game release was Katekyo Hitman Reborn! DS: Shinuki Max! Vongola Carnival!! on March 29, 2007 for the Nintendo DS. On June 28 the Flame Rumble: Mukuro Kyōshū fighting game was released, with four other games in the Flame Rumble series released for the DS from September 20, 2007 to July 22, 2010. Katekyo Hitman Reborn! Dream Hyper Battle! was released for PlayStation 2 (PS2) on August 30, 2007 and for the Wii on January 10, 2008. Unlike the PlayStation 2 version, the Wii game added characters from the fight between the Vongola and the Varia. The adventure game Let's Ansatsu!? Nerawareta Ju-daime! was released for the PS2 on October 25, 2007 and a sugoroku-inspired game, Vongola Shiki Taisen Battle Sugoroku, was released on March 27, 2008 for the DS.

Katekyo Hitman Reborn! DS: Fate of Heat, a role-playing fight game, was released for Nintendo DS on May 1, 2008, followed by two sequels: Fate of Heat II: Unmei no Futari on April 16, 2009 and Fate of Heat III: Yuki no Gādian Raishū! on April 29, 2010. An adventure game, Katekyo Hitman Reborn! Nerae!? Ring x Vongola Trainers, was released for the PS2 on August 28, 2008. Katekyo Hitman Reborn! Battle Arena and Katekyo Hitman Reborn! Battle Arena 2: Spirit Burst were released for the PlayStation Portable (PSP) on September 18, 2008 and September 17, 2009, respectively. Another PSP game, Katekyo Hitman Reborn! Kizuna no Tag Battle, was released on February 25, 2010. Katekyo Hitman Reborn! Kindan no Yami no Delta, an action-adventure game for the Wii and PS2, was released in Japan on November 20, 2008. Three other DS games were released: Katekyo Hitman Reborn! DS: Mafia Daishūgō Vongola Festival!! on December 4, 2008, Katekyo Hitman Reborn! DS: Ore ga Bosu! Saikyō Family Taisen on December 17, 2009 and Nari Chara: Katekyo Hitman Reborn! for DSiWare on January 27, 2010.

Radio
A radio show, began on September 10, 2007, after the following week's episode was recorded. Its hosts are Hidekazu Ichinose (the voice of Hayato Gokudera), Suguru Inoue (the voice of Takeshi Yamamoto) and Rika Ishibashi (the assistant). Guests have appeared since the tenth episode, and it was produced before a live audience during the 2007 Christmas break and (late in the series) in Osaka, Nagoya, and Tokyo. Although the planned final episode of ~Bucchake Ring Tournament~ aired on June 30, 2008, it resumed three weeks later.

Books
A book, Katekyō Hitman Reborn! Official Character Book Vongola 77, was published on October 4, 2007, in Japan. Based on the manga, it covers 77 incidents since Reborn joined the Sawada household. The book profiles major characters, with brief side stories not appearing in the manga and color posters by Akira Amano. Katekyō Hitman Reborn! Sōshūhen: Vongola Family, a book focusing on Tsuna, Reborn and Tsuna's Guardians was released on October 30, 2009. On April 2, 2010 an artbook, Reborn Colore!, was published.

Five Reborn! light novels by Hideaki Koyasu and illustrated by Akira Amano, originally serialized in Jump Square, were published by Shueisha. In the first, published on March 12, 2007, Mukuro Rokudo takes over Kokuyo High. The second, published on February 5, 2008, recaps the mystery of Xanxus. A third, published on July 3, 2009, focuses on the Millefiore and Vongola families. The fourth and fifth novels were published on April 30, 2010 and May 2, 2011, respectively.

Reception
The Reborn! manga is popular in Japan and, according to Mainichi Shimbun, has one of the greatest number of cosplayers in the country. In 2007 it was the tenth-bestselling series in Weekly Shōnen Jump, with a total of seven million copies sold; in 2008, its sales increased to 15 million copies. Reborn! was among Japan's top-selling series for several years. In 2008 the manga sold 3.3 million copies, the country's fourth-bestselling series. In 2009 it was the sixth-bestselling series in Japan, with sales of 3,694,323 copies. In 2010 Reborn! was the eighth-bestselling series, with sales of 3,479,219 copies. The manga was the 24th-bestselling series in 2012, with sales of 1,844,824 copies. As of 2016, the manga had over 30 million copies in circulation. Reborn!s second light novel was the third-bestseller in Japan in 2008, with sales of 106,229 copies. The anime's DVDs are also popular, sometimes making the Japanese Animation DVD Rankings.

In November 2014, readers of Media Factory's Da Vinci magazine voted Reborn! #17 on a list of Weekly Shōnen Jumps greatest manga series of all time. On TV Asahi's Manga Sōsenkyo 2021 poll, in which 150.000 people voted for their top 100 manga series, Reborn! ranked #67. Reborn! ranked 64th on NHK's Best 100 Anime Ranking poll, hold to honor the medium's 100th anniversary.

Reborn! has been reviewed a number of times. According to Carlo Santos of Anime News Network, although the manga's first volume had a weak plot and its art was "downright messy and crowded" there was "volatile chemistry" between Tsuna and Reborn. Popcultureshock.com said that the series was aimed at girls because of the number of male characters, and cited its good combination of artwork and humor. A. E. Sparrow of IGN liked its lampooning of the "Mafia concept" and the manga's artwork, saying the "cartoonish characters exist alongside chiseled, well-sculpted figures". The series' change in tone evoked a variety of responses; in a ninth-volume review Sparrow said the series "is quickly becoming a great shōnen read in no small part due to this current storyline", noting its evolution since Tsuna began to grow up and the fights became more violent. According to Comicbookbin.com, although the fights were well-done and the series was still funny, volume eight of the manga was too violent and ordinary readers might find it strange. Ben Leary of Mania Entertainment was lukewarm about the series' darker tone since the eighth volume. Praising the fights and the handling of the tournament between the Vongola and the Varia, he missed the series' comedy and hoped it would return after the tournament. Manga News praised Akira Amano's progressing art and visually stunning fight, but finds the ending too abrupt when there are still some unanswered questions.

Notes

References

External links

 Shueisha's Official Reborn! Site 
 TV Tokyo's Official Reborn! Site 
 

Reborn!
2007 Japanese novels
Adventure anime and manga
Anime series based on manga
Artland (company)
Comedy anime and manga
Discotek Media
Light novels
Organized crime in anime and manga
Shueisha franchises
Shueisha manga
Shōnen manga
Supernatural anime and manga
TV Tokyo original programming
Viz Media anime
Viz Media manga